Thigpen is a family name that may refer to:

 Ben Thigpen (1908–1971), American jazz drummer
 Corbett H. Thigpen (died 1999), American psychiatrist
 Cressie Thigpen (born 1946), American jurist and lawyer
 Ed Thigpen (1930–2010), American jazz drummer
 Lynne Thigpen (1948–2003), American film and television actress
 Owen Thigpen/Fitzpen/Phippen (1582–1636), English merchant 
 Richard Ashley Thigpen (born 1943), American academic
 Anita Thigpen Perry (born 1952), First Lady of Texas

Athletes
 Bobby Thigpen (born 1963), American former Major League relief pitcher
 Curtis Thigpen (born 1983), American former Major League catcher
 J. H. Thigpen, American college football player during the 1912-1915 seasons
 Justus Thigpen (born 1947), American former professional basketball player
 Marcus Thigpen (born 1986), American football player for the Buffalo Bills (NFL)
 Tommy Thigpen (born 1971), American college football coach and former player
 Tyler Thigpen, (born 1984) Buffalo Bills Quarterback
 Yancey Thigpen (born 1969), American former professional American Football wide receiver